Christchurch United Football Club is an amateur association football club in Christchurch, New Zealand. They compete in various Mainland Football competitions at Junior and Senior level. The club has won six National League titles and six Chatham Cup trophies. Christchurch United are the current Southern League champions.

Club history

Formation

The club was formed via the merger and support of several Christchurch clubs in the early 1970s, ostensibly to provide a strong Christchurch team for participation in the New Zealand National Soccer League.

The teams involved were Christchurch City AFC, Western AFC, Shamrock, and Christchurch Technical, though some of these sides continued to play on as separate sides after the formation of United.

Glory Years

When the New Zealand National League formed in 1970, Christchurch United was the only applicant from the South Island to take part in the inaugural competition. The Christchurch United squad set multiple milestones in the first season of the competition, including the first player to score a hat-trick after Robin Taylor’s four goals against Gisborne City. United finished their first season in the National League in third place behind Eastern Suburbs and champions Blockhouse Bay. The second season finished with another third-place finish, this time missing out on the title by a single point to champions Mount Wellington. 

In the 1972 season, Christchurch United claimed its first piece of silverware with a victory over Mount Wellington to secure the Chatham Cup. With a 4-4 draw in Wellington followed by a 1-1 draw at English Park, United claimed their first trophy after a 2-1 win at Newmarket Park in Auckland. 
Following their first silverware in 1972, Christchurch United went on to win the 1973 National League in a record-breaking season: United won the title by eight points, as well as conceding only 11 goals in 18 matches. In 1974, United won their second Chatham Cup by defeating Wellington Diamond United 2-0 with goals from club legends Ian Park and Brian Hardman. 

The 1975 season proved to be one of the best in the history of the club, winning both the National League and Chatham Cup against a competitive North Shore United team. This double was the first of its kind achieved in the history of New Zealand football and remains the strongest season in the history of the club. Former New Zealand international Phil Dando, who played for United in the 1975 season, lauded a team that had a strong winning mentality, and “an incredible inner drive” to chase their footballing dreams. This mentality was perfectly personified by the arrival of a 17-year-old Steve Sumner, whose intensity during training and games made him a now-legendary figure in the club. 
After a disappointing couple of seasons, United bounced back to win a third National League title in 1978, largely thanks to a near-unwavering backline that conceded only 16 goals in 22 games. This period of football is widely regarded to be the most successful in the history of the club thus far.

1980s

The early 1980s did not show the same success that Christchurch United had achieved in the 1970s, in large part due to a significant exodus of players who went to play in the Australian League. The tide began to change in 1987, when United won their last seven games consecutively to secure the National League title. The club also won the now-defunct NZFA Challenge Cup, but were denied a treble season by Gisborne City, who humbled United 7-3 over two games. 
United made it two in a row by winning the 1988 National League, in which the club set the national record for least goals conceded in a 26-match season, with 14. This season also saw United legend Keith Braithwaite put six goals past Manurewa during an 8-0 win, another record that stands to this day. The following year, Christchurch United won the Chatham Cup for the fifth time after defeating Rotorua City 7-1, which remains the largest margin of victory for a Chatham Cup final.

The Gisborne Incident

On August 10, 1981, a disagreement between players and head coach Terry Conley occurred in which six players were assigned fines for drinking alcohol the night before a game. Four of the six fined players refused to pay their fines, as they insisted, they had not been drinking and had been lumped in with the other two players who were, due to them being in the same room as the pair. 
This standoff between the coach and the players resulted in Christchurch United having to field only nine men against Gisborne City, in what has been described as “a bizarre and unique situation unlikely to ever occur again at that level of football anywhere in the world”. The event was immortalised in local football folklore as “the Gisborne Incident”, an event that resulted in four key players, including club legends Bobby Almond and Ian Park subsequently leaving the club.

1990s

Despite successes in the National League and Chatham Cup competitions, Christchurch United had not won both trophies in the same season since 1975. Having won the National League in dominant fashion in 1991, Christchurch United subsequently defeated Wellington United 2-1 in an intense Chatham Cup final that saw United claim their second double in club history. This 1991 season is often coined as being one of the most significant in club history, alongside the 1975 season. 
At the end of the National League season the following year, the competition was disbanded by the New Zealand Football Association. 1993 then saw the introduction of a regional competition with a playoff system, in which United failed to replicate the success of previous eras. As a result, the club spent the best part of the 1990s finishing low or mid table in the Superclub Southern League. In 1997, Christchurch United was one of the Christchurch-based clubs that proposed a Canterbury League, designed to ease the burden of travel costs that had become increasingly difficult to budget. This proposal resulted in the creation of the Canterbury Premier League, which morphed into today’s Mainland Premier League.

1998 - 2006 Canterbury Premier League

The first year of the Canterbury Premier League saw United field a strong team composed of current and future New Zealand internationals, including the young yet unwavering pair of Ryan Nelsen and Ben Sigmund in central defence. Christchurch United won the 1998 season by seven points, scoring 67 and conceding six. 
The following three years became a three-way battle between Christchurch United, Christchurch Rangers, and newly formed Halswell United, in which United struggled to overcome the dominance of the other two. Lack of funding in the following few seasons saw the club slip further down the table, and the club were relegated in 2006 for the first time in their history.

2007 – 2016

The competition in the second tier of Canterbury Football was notoriously fierce, which was noted when Burnside put on a dominant 2007 season that let them finish 14 points clear of third-place United. After an intense match against Avon United in the penultimate game of the 2008 season, a 3-2 victory, courtesy of a 91st minute winner by Danny Atwell, spurred the team to a 6-0 victory against Canterbury United in the final game of the season to secure promotion back to the Mainland Premier League. 
United fought in the lower end of the Mainland Premier League for several years, and the loss of their home ground following the destruction of QEII Stadium from the 2010-2011 Christchurch earthquakes forced the team to relocate from what had been their home ground since 1974. Now playing their home games from English Park, United were relegated for a second time in 2012. After a hard-fought couple of seasons, the club were once again promoted to the Mainland Premier League in 2014. 
In the following season, United moved their first team games to Spreydon Domain for the first time in the club’s history, which brought the junior and senior sections of the club closer together. During this period, United began to merge the committees of both sections; this resulted in first team players getting more involved with the junior teams and provided the opportunity for youth players to break into the first team. However, a rocky season resulted in the club’s third relegation in 2015.

2017 – present

With the future of the club surrounded by uncertainty, the Christchurch United board began merger discussions with the Christchurch Football Academy (CFA), an independent entity that had formed in 2014. The CFA was created by Russian businessman Vyacheslav Meyn, who had settled in the city in 2009 and established the CFA to provide an all-year-round football program in Christchurch. Due to local regulations, the CFA had been unable to establish a new club in the city and were instead encouraged to merge with a pre-existing club in Christchurch. United struck an agreement with the CFA in late 2016, and a new board was created with representatives from both Christchurch United and the CFA. 
Following a couple of disappointing seasons, United appointed former New Zealand international and club legend Danny Halligan as first team head coach in 2019. Christchurch United dominated the 2019 season by going on a 12-game winning streak and finishing the season with 57 goals scored and only five conceded. The following promotion to the Mainland Premier League is where the club has remained since. The 2021 season ended with Christchurch United finishing third in the Mainland Premier League, and narrowly missing out on the English Cup after a 2-0 defeat to Cashmere Technical in the final. United parted ways with Halligan in late 2021, appointing Samoa Women’s National Team head coach Paul Ifill in his place.

Trophies

National League titles: 1973, 1975, 1978, 1987, 1988, 1991

Chatham Cup winners: 1972, 1974, 1975, 1976, 1989, 1991.

Canterbury League Champions: 1998, 2022

Canterbury Division 1: 2008, 2014

Canterbury Championship League: 2019

Notable players
A total of 44 players from Christchurch United have represented New Zealand at an international level, including two World Cup captains Steve Sumner and Ryan Nelsen.

During their successful run in the 1970s, many players from Christchurch United were called up to represent New Zealand on the international stage. Imported players that Christchurch United had signed from the United Kingdom and Australia were swiftly naturalised and became eligible to play for their adopted country. Club legends such as Ken France, Ian Park, Bobby Almond, and Steve Sumner all played for New Zealand, with Sumner captaining the team during their 1982 World Cup Campaign. 

During the 1982 World Cup, seven players from Christchurch United competed against Brazil, Scotland, and the Soviet Union, with Steve Sumner scoring New Zealand’s first ever World Cup goal against Scotland. Sumner remains Christchurch United’s most prolific goal scorer for New Zealand, with 22 goals, and holds the record number of appearances at 105, with 58 full internationals. 

In recent years, former Christchurch United icon Ryan Nelsen captained the unbeaten squad of the 2010 World Cup in South Africa, with draws against Paraguay, Slovakia, and defending world champions Italy. Nelsen was paired in defence with former Christchurch United defender Ben Sigmund. 

The following former players have all represented New Zealand

Ryan Nelsen
Bobby Almond
Keith Braithwaite
Glen Collins
Ceri Evans
Graham Griffiths
Danny Halligan
Brian Hardman
Iain Marshall
Michael McGarry

Ian Park
Ben Sigmund
Alan Stroud
Steve Sumner
Frank van Hattum
Johan Verweij
Steve Wooddin
Phil Dando

External links

Christchurch United webpage
Mainland Soccer - Club Page
NZ Clubs Database

Association football clubs established in 1970
Association football clubs in Christchurch
1970 establishments in New Zealand